Israel Platt Pardee Mansion is a historic home located at Hazleton, Luzerne County, Pennsylvania.  It was designed by architect George Franklin Barber and built in 1893.  It is a large, 3-story, 19 room, clapboarded Victorian dwelling in the Queen Anne style.  It measures approximately 50 feet wide, 75 feet deep, and 50 feet tall.  It features a huge, tin-roofed wraparound porch and a turret.  Also on the property is a contributing carriage house.  The house was built by Israel Platt Pardee (1852 - 1934), son of Ario Pardee (1810 - 1892) founder of Hazleton.

It was added to the National Register of Historic Places in 1984.

References

Houses on the National Register of Historic Places in Pennsylvania
Queen Anne architecture in Pennsylvania
Houses completed in 1893
Houses in Luzerne County, Pennsylvania
Hazleton, Pennsylvania
National Register of Historic Places in Luzerne County, Pennsylvania